Adriaen Coorte (ca. 1665 – after 1707) was a Dutch Golden Age painter of still lifes, who signed works between 1683 and 1707. He painted small and unpretentious still lifes in a style more typical of the first half of the century, and was "one of the last practitioners of this intimate category".

Biography
Very little is known of his life, but he is assumed to have been born and died in Middelburg. He became a pupil of Melchior d'Hondecoeter around 1680 in Amsterdam. Hondecoeter is known for repetitions of certain birds in certain poses, and he apparently took on pupils who were set to work copying these into their compositions. They form an unmistakable signature in the work of his students, and Coorte is no exception:

From 1683 he seems to have returned to Middelburg, where he set up a workshop and signed his small, carefully balanced minimalist still lifes. He often painted on paper that was glued to a wooden panel. About 80 signed works by him have been catalogued, and nearly all of them follow the same pattern; small arrangements of fruits, vegetables, or shells on a stone slab, lit from above, with the dark background typical of still lifes earlier in the century. Instead of the Chinese or silver vessels favoured by his contemporaries, his tableware is very basic pottery. "Objects and light are studied intensely, and are painted with a wondrous tenderness". Neither his birth nor death date is certain, and archival evidence only exists in Middelburg for his membership in the Guild of St. Luke there from 1695 onwards, when he was fined for selling a painting without being a member of the guild. His works appear frequently in contemporary Middelburg taxation inventories

Works

Coorte was apparently not well known to his contemporaries outside the small city of Middelburg and, like Vermeer a century before, he was almost entirely forgotten until the 1950s, when the Dutch art historian Laurens J. Bol revived his reputation, beginning with an article in 1952, and finally publishing the first monograph and catalogue raisonné on Coorte in 1977 (Adriaen Coorte, Amsterdam).  Bol arranged an exhibition of 35 examples of Coorte's work in 1958 at the Dordrechts Museum, which became a sensation in the Netherlands, with the poets Hans Faverey and Ed Leeflang both being inspired by the paintings. In 2003 there was an exhibition at the National Gallery of Art, Washington.  In 2008 a new travelling exhibition was set up; Ode to Coorte, that was as nearly as successful, making Coorte the most celebrated "rediscovered" Dutch Baroque painter of recent decades.
Testifying to Coorte's recent popularity is the December 1st, 2009 auction of two of his new-found paintings, which each sold for more than ten times the estimated price.

A new price record for the artist was set at the 3 December 2014 Sotheby's auction when a painting called Three peaches on a stone ledge with a red admiral butterfly sold for £3,444,500.

His paintings have been compared to Spanish Bodegones, but he may also have been influenced by older painters:

Notes

References
Seymour Slive, Dutch Painting, 1600-1800, Yale UP, 1995, 
Dordt's museum on Ode to Coorte

Further reading

External links

Adriaen Coorte: A Unique Late 17th Century Dutch Still Life Painter, by Laurens J. Bol, Van Gorkum, 1977
Adriaen Coorte op Artcyclopedia
Adriaen Coorte, four still lifes in the Rijksmuseum Amsterdam

1660s births
1700s deaths
Dutch Golden Age painters
Dutch male painters
Dutch still life painters
People from Middelburg, Zeeland